This is a partial list of war correspondents who reported from North Africa or Italy in 1942-43, during World War II. Some of the names are taken from the war journal of Eric Lloyd Williams, a correspondent for Reuters and the South African Press Association during the war, and from a radio broadcast he made in 1944.

James Aldridge, The New York Times
Bruce Anderson, South African Broadcasting Corporation
Graham (G. E.) Beamish, New Zealand correspondent
Jack Belden, LIFE
Paul Bewsher, Daily Mail
Homer Bigart, New York Herald Tribune
Eric Bigio, Daily Express
Hal Boyle, Associated Press
Sam Brewer, Chicago Tribune 
Christopher Buckley, The Daily Telegraph
Norman Clark, News Chronicle
Alexander Clifford, Daily Mail
Edward Harry Crockett, Associated Press
Walter Cronkite, United Press
Daniel De Luce, Associated Press
Richard Dimbleby, BBC
David Divine, The Sunday Times
Robert Dunnett, BBC
William ("Willy") Forrest, News Chronicle (wounded in the head)
Frank Gervasi, Collier’s Weekly
Frank Gillard, BBC
Hank Gorrell, United Press
Les Green, South African Broadcasting Corporation
Harold Guard, United Press
Matthew Halton, Toronto Star, Canadian Broadcasting Corporation
Guy Harriot, Sydney Morning Herald
Bruce Hewitt, New Zealand Press Association
Russell Hill, New York Herald Tribune

Geoffrey Hoare, The Times
Clare Hollingworth, Daily Express, Chicago Daily News
Alaric Jacob, Daily Express
Denis Johnston, BBC
Philip Jordan, News Chronicle
Ed Kennedy, Associated Press
George Lait, International News Service
Ronald Legge, The Daily Telegraph
Alexander Gault MacGowan, The Sun (New York)
John MacVane, NBC
Denis Martin, Daily Herald
Frank Martin, Associated Press
Richard McMillan, United Press
Bill Mauldin, Cartoonist, Stars and Stripes
Drew Middleton, The New York Times
Ronald Monson, Daily Express and Australian newspapers
Alan Moorehead, Daily Express
Allen Morrison, first Black reporter in WWII for Stars and Stripes
Chester Morrison, CBS
Leonard Mosley, Allied Newspapers
William Munday, Australian newspapers
Gerald Norman, The Times
John (Tex) O'Reilly, New York Herald Tribune
Ernie Pyle, Scripps-Howard Newspapers
Albert Victor Ravenholt, United Press
Quentin Reynolds, Collier’s Weekly
Frederick Salusbury, Daily Herald
Nestor Solodovnik, TASS News Agency
Norman Soong, Chinese press
Edmund Stevens, Christian Science Monitor
Bill Stoneman, Chicago Daily News
John Sutherland, South African Press Association
Jack Thompson, Chicago Tribune
George Tucker, Associated Press
Wynford Vaughan-Thomas, BBC
Ralph Walling, Reuters
Alan Whicker, British Army's Film and Photo Unit
Don Whitehead, Associated Press
Eric Lloyd Williams, Reuters/South African Press Association
Chester Wilmott, BBC and ABC
Harry Zinder, TIME

References

42-43
World War II, 1942-1943
War correspondents, 1942-43